Balmoral Ridge is a rural locality in the Sunshine Coast Region, Queensland, Australia.

Geography

In the north the locality lies adjacent to Baroon Pocket Dam.  Balmoral Lookout is located on a prominent ridge of the range along Maleny Montville Road.  Obi Obi Creek marks a majority of the western boundary.

Maleny–Montville Road passes through from south to north-east.

History
Traditionally the district was informally known as Balmoral. However, in 1989 when the Caloundra City Council asked to make it an official place name, the Queensland Government was concerned about potential for confusion with Balmoral in the City of Brisbane and decided that it be officially named Balmoral Ridge.

The median age of the Balmoral Ridge population was 55 years, 18 years above the national median of 37.  68.2% of people living in Balmoral Ridge were born in Australia. The other top responses for country of birth were England 5.7%, New Zealand 4.3%, Scotland 1.4%, Finland 1.4%, Canada 1.1%.  87.8% of people spoke only English at home; the next most common languages were 1.8% Afrikaans, 1.8% German.

Attractions 
There are two lookouts in Balmoral Ridge, both on the Maleny Montville Road:

 Gerrard Lookout
 Balmoral Lookout

See also
Blackall Range road network

References

Suburbs of the Sunshine Coast Region
Localities in Queensland